Kommuna is a rural locality (a village) in Muromsky District, Vladimir Oblast, Russia. The population was 11 as of 2010. There are 2 streets.

Geography 
Kommuna is located 15 km northwest of Murom. Stroydetal is the nearest rural locality.

References 

Rural localities in Muromsky District